Appley Bridge railway station serves the villages of Appley Bridge and Shevington, both in Metropolitan Borough of Wigan, Greater Manchester in England. The station is in Lancashire, but it is supported by the Greater Manchester Passenger Transport Executive and as such within the TfGM ticketing zone. It is operated by Northern Trains.

The main stone-built station building survives adjacent to the Wigan-bound platform, but is now a public house; there are modest shelters on both platforms for rail travellers.

History
The station was built by the Manchester and Southport Railway and opened on 9 April 1855. From January 1885 it was part of the Lancashire and Yorkshire Railway (L&YR). The main stone-built station building (no longer in use) was built during that time, in the standard L&YR style. The L&YR amalgamated with the London and North Western Railway on 1 January 1922, and this, in turn, was grouped into the London, Midland and Scottish Railway (LMS) in 1923. Nationalisation followed in 1948. When sectorisation was introduced in the 1980s, the station was served by Regional Railways until the privatisation of British Rail.

A Greater Manchester Council landfill site and transfer terminal was formerly located a short distance west of the station, served by a siding connection from the up (eastbound) line. This received regular trainloads of domestic waste from terminals in and around Manchester from the early 1980s until 1995, when the site reached capacity and was closed. The defunct siding is still intact and is visible from passing trains.

Facilities
The station is unmanned, but there is a ticket machine provided to allow passengers to buy prior to travel or collect pre-paid tickets.  Train running information can be obtained by phone and timetable posters.  There is step-free access to both platforms from the nearby road bridge via ramps.

Services
On Monday to Saturday daytimes, there are two trains an hour westbound to Southport and eastbound to Wigan.

On Sundays, there is an hourly service to Southport and Blackburn via Manchester Victoria.

See also

Listed buildings in Wrightington

References

External links

 Station on navigable O.S. map.

Railway stations in the Borough of West Lancashire
DfT Category F1 stations
Former Lancashire and Yorkshire Railway stations
Railway stations in Great Britain opened in 1855
Northern franchise railway stations